The Quiraing is a landslip on the eastern face of , the northernmost summit of the Trotternish on the Isle of Skye, Scotland. The whole of the Trotternish Ridge escarpment was formed by a great series of landslips; the Quiraing is the only part of the slip still moving – the road at its base, near Flodigarry, requires repairs each year.

Parts of the distinctive landscape have earned particular names.  The Needle is a jagged  landmark pinnacle, a remnant of landslipping. Northwest of it is The Table, a flat grassy area slipped down from the summit plateau, with vistas of the Torridon Hills and the mountains of Wester Ross. Southwest is the Prison, a pyramidal rocky peak which can look like a medieval keep when viewed from the right angle – the ascent of this is an airy scramble.

The name Quiraing comes from Old Norse , which means 'Round Fold'. Within the fold is The Table, an elevated plateau hidden amongst the pillars. It is said that the fold was used to conceal cattle from Viking raiders.

External links 
 

Mountains and hills of the Isle of Skye
Landslides in the United Kingdom